Sergey Sergeyevich Sheyko (born January 23, 1967, Oleksandriia in present-day Ukraine), Hero of the Russian Federation, is a colonel in Russian Naval Infantry.

Sergey Sheyko was commissioned into the Naval Infantry in 1989 after completing the Far Eastern Higher Combined Arms Command School. In January–May 1995 captain Sheyko, commander of marine company, participated in the First Chechen War, including storming of Presidential Palace in Grozny. He showed outstanding degree of personal courage and military mastership. In fierce battles his group performed important tasks, with virtually no losses of his subordinates. His first citation for the title of Hero of the Russian Federation was issued in February 1995 but did not materialize; he was awarded the title of Hero on August 28, 1995.

Sheyko completed postgraduate military education in the Combined Arms Academy of the Armed Forces of the Russian Federation (2000) and General Staff Academy (2005) and, at 2009, service with the Baltic Fleet naval infantry.
Since 2017 retired colonel.

References
Hero of Russia Sheyko Sergey Sergeyevich, WarHeroes.Ru (in Russian)
Belostok Naval Infantry Brigade (in Russian)

Heroes of the Russian Federation
Russian military personnel
1967 births
Russian people of Ukrainian descent
Living people
People from Oleksandriia
Far Eastern Higher Combined Arms Command School alumni
Military Academy of the General Staff of the Armed Forces of Russia alumni
Fellows of the American Physical Society